The Public Stores Act 1875 (38 & 39 Vict c 25) is an Act of the Parliament of the United Kingdom which applied to all stores under the care of the Secretary of State, including "any public department or office, or of any person in the service of Her Majesty." Although in parts now superseded by subsequent legislation, or otherwise defunct, some sections are still in force. This includes a power of stop and search that is still available to police constables today.

The Act

The Act created various offences relating to the destruction or concealment of such stores, unlawfully possess or steal such stores, and also empowered police constables to stop and search any vehicles or vessels in which he has reasonable grounds to suspect is carrying any aforementioned stores which had been obtained illegally. This power of stop and search is still exercisable by constables today. Other than the Poaching Prevention Act 1862, it is the oldest search power in UK legislation.

The Act also prohibited searching for stores, or sweeping or dredging within 100 yards of any naval base, wharf or warehouse, or moored vessel of the Royal Naval or any such properties belonging to the Royal Artillery.

See also
 Broad arrow

References
"Public Stores Act 1875". Halsbury's Statutes of England and Wales. Fourth Edition. Volume 12(1). 2008 Reissue. Page 181 to 186.
"The Public Stores Act 1875". Halsbury's Statutes of England. Third Edition. Butterworths. London. 1969. Volume 8. Pages 200 to 205.
"The Public Stores Act, 1875". Halsbury's Statutes of England. (The Complete Statutes of England). First Edition. Butterworth & Co (Publishers) Limited. Bell Yard, Temple Bar, London. 1929. Volume 4:  . Page 683 to 687.
Lely, J M. "Public Stores". The Statutes of Practical Utility. (Chitty's Statutes). Fifth Edition. Sweet and Maxwell. Stevens and Sons. London. 1895. Volume 10. Title "Public Improvements". Pages 80 to 84.
The Statutes: Third Revised Edition. HMSO. 1950. Volume 9. Page 395 et seq.
The Statutes Revised: Northern Ireland. Second Edition. HMSO. Volume 2. Page 1033 et seq.
"Public Stores Act, 1875" (1875) 39 The Justice of the Peace 755 (27 November)
Jervis, John. "Offences relating to Public Stores". Archbold's Pleading and Evidence in Criminal Cases. Nineteenth Edition, by William Bruce. Henry Sweet. Stevens and Sons. London. 1878. Book II. Part II. Chapter I. Section 10. Pages 849 to 851.

External links

United Kingdom Acts of Parliament 1875